BNX may refer to:
Banja Luka International Airport
Branxton railway station, New South Wales
Benoxinate, a local anaesthetic agent
bnx, device name assigned by Solaris operating systems to Broadcom NetXtreme II Gigabit Ethernet adapters